Thomas Erskine, Lord Erskine (1705 – 16 March 1766) was the son of John Erskine, 6th Earl of Mar. He could not inherit the title of Earl of Mar due to the Writ of Attainder for treason passed against his father in 1716 for his role in the First Jacobite Rebellion (1715).

Thomas, Lord Erskine, son of John, 6th and 23rd Earl of Mar was initiated in Lodge Kilwinning Scots Arms, Edinburgh, No.3, in 1736. His name is second on the list of registrations in Grand Lodge made by Kilwinning Scots Arms in 1739. This Lodge had large military personnel and is now defunct. Lord Erskine, being under the shadow of his father's attainder, and being denied succession to the title of Earl of Mar, led the quiet life of a country gentleman and had more time to devote himself to the study of Freemasonry. He was elected Grand Master Mason of Scotland in 1749. This undoubtedly led to a quickening of interest in the Craft in Alloa. Thereafter stray names of Alloa men begin to appear in the minutes of the Lodge of Stirling. Within five years a Depute Lodge was regularly meeting in Alloa.

On 1 October 1741, he married Charlotte Hope, daughter of the Charles Hope, 1st Earl of Hopetoun. He died without issue.

Notes

1705 births
1766 deaths
British courtesy barons and lords of Parliament
Heirs apparent who never acceded
Members of the Parliament of Great Britain for Scottish constituencies
British MPs 1727–1734
British MPs 1741–1747
British MPs 1747–1754
Dukes of Mar